The naval battles of the American Civil War, fought between the Union and the Confederacy, changed the foundations of naval warfare with the first use of ironclads and submarines, and the introduction of newer and more powerful naval artillery.

The first shots of the naval war were fired on April 12, 1861, during the Battle of Fort Sumter, by the US Revenue Cutter Service cutter . The final shots were fired on June 22, 1865, by the Confederate raider  in the Bering Strait, more than two months after General Robert E. Lee's surrender of the Confederate Army.

Significant battles

Hampton Roads
The battle took place on March 8, 1862, and lasted for several hours, resulting in a tactical draw. These revolutionary new warships were protected by the thick armor plating that gives them the name ironclad, which prevented any lasting damage to either ship.

New Orleans
The battle of Forts Jackson and St. Philip in 1862 can be divided into two parts: a mostly-ineffective bombardment of the Confederate-held forts by the raft-mounted mortars, and the successful passage of the forts by much of Farragut's fleet on the night of April 24. During the passage, one Federal warship was lost and three others turned back, while the Confederate gunboats were virtually obliterated. The subsequent capture of the city, achieved with no further significant opposition, was a serious, even fatal, blow from which the Confederacy never recovered.

First Charleston
A second great naval battle occurred at Charleston, South Carolina, in 1863. In this battle, called the First Battle of Charleston Harbor, the Union Navy sent Admiral Du Pont with nine ironclads to attack Charleston. When given the order, the admiral did not expect to be victorious. He would have to steer his ships upriver to the fort and attack it from a standstill, giving the Confederates a valuable edge. The Union Navy was forced to retreat within two hours to prevent too many casualties in a single battle, which would irreparably cripple the navy. Because of this failure, the Union would blockade Charleston for two more years, while the Confederacy was able to set up several more forts along the coast of South Carolina.

Cherbourg
Alabama fired the first shot, but Kearsarge was slightly faster, had more firepower, and carried a larger crew complement than Alabama, giving the Union the advantage. The Confederate ship took many hits and casualties, and the rising water shut off its engines, leaving the surviving crew with no other choice but to surrender and be rescued by Kearsarge.

Other purposes

The navies on both sides not only engaged in battle, but also transported foot soldiers, equipment, and supplies. Without a navy, neither army would have had the supplies or manpower necessary to successfully carry out the war.

Thus, one major strategy of the Union navy involved blockading Southern ports, preventing the South from receiving supplies or aid from allies via shipping ports. Vital supplies such as food, water, ammunition, guns, clothes, and medical supplies never made it to the Confederate troops. The Confederates retained a sufficient amount of resources to withstand the blockade for an extended period of time, causing the war to last longer than expected. However, the blockade continued to prevent the Confederate troops from replenishing their supplies, which in part led to their eventual surrender.

Naval ships on both sides also served as much-needed floating hospitals, housing and treating soldiers who had been injured in battle.

Battles

See also

 Union Navy
 Confederate States Navy
 Bibliography of early American naval history
 History of the United States Navy
 History of the United States Coast Guard

Notes

External links
 
 Naval History of the Civil War March 1862
 U.S. Coast Guard History

 
American Civil War
Battles Of The American Civil War